VCT Tour 2019 is the first concert tour by Vietnamese singer-songwriter Vũ Cát Tường (VCT). The tour started on August 31, 2019, in Hanoi and ended on December 15, 2019, in Ho Chi Minh City.

Throughout the tour, each concert has a different vibe, style, visual effect and emotions. The tour brought unforgettable moments for the attendees.

Release context 
After 2 concerts – "Birthday concert" (2017) and "Stardom concert" (2018), on June 1, 2019, Vũ Cát Tường announced the tour by posted the official poster on Instagram and immediately attracted many fans and audiences about her first concert tour in music career. Then, the first destination was revealed – Hanoi.

Concerts details and content 
There were 2 concerts in the tour. Happened in Hanoi and Ho Chi Minh City.

Dear Hanoi, concert 
This is VCT's first concert in Hanoi. With the inspiration from The Little Prince – an iconic image that has same character with Vũ Cát Tường. The stage had a small asteroid model – symbolized for the place VCT live and enjoy her own life. Throughout the concert, Vũ Cát Tường has invited the fans to visit her asteroid through songs with chilling, soft and romantic melodies.
"If the first songs I performed are the key to open my little house, then the next songs will lead you to my bedroom, where the deepest and most private things are going to reveal"

– Vũ Cát Tường

In the concert, she also invited Hồng Nhung – VCT's judge and couch when she was in The Voice Vietnam, 2013. Two of her contestants that Tường taught in The Voice Kids: Ngọc Ánh and Anh Tuấn.

The concert was a trip to Vũ Cát Tường' planet – where she always returns after challenges and difficties. The attendees knew more about her career path, and share the feelings together.

Inner Me concert 

On November 9, 2019, the ticket website of Inner Me concert opened. After released the album Inner Me – recorded in Hollywood, US, Inner Me concert is the first promoting show for the album.

The Inner Me concert is the first concert in Vietnam using infinity LED stage effect, include movement sensors and Lazer. In the concert, Vũ Cát Tường performed 21 song, included 8 first-live songs in the new album. When the concert began, some 5,000 people crowded, and in the first performance – Leader, VCT appeared on a giant Cheetah model, showed that she is a brave, hard working and confident artist. The 4 side stage helped all the audiences to enjoy both visual effects and sounds.

" Today, in this Inner Me concert, you guys will see a prichly, full of ambitions, brave Vũ Cát Tường, and full of wounds too."

– Vũ Cát Tường

Songs list 
The songs below are from both "Dear Hanoi" and "Inner Me" concerts.

Em ơi (Dear babe)
Buổi sáng bình thường (Typical morning)
Vài phút trước (Last minute)
San Francisco
Ngày hôm qua (Can't get enough)
Tôi (Myself)
Cô gái ngày hôm qua (The girl from yesterday)
Be A Fool
Stardom
Don't you go
Tôi xưa nay Hà Nội (The old and current me in Hanoi)
Đông (Winter)
If
Vết mưa (Rainy)
Yêu xa (Long-distance love)
Nobody
One Second
Leader
The Party Song
Có Người (Someone)
Dõi Theo (Watching you from afar)
Hỏi thăm (How Are You)
Gió (Wind)
The Old You
Ticket For Two
Yours
Forever Mine

 Accolades 
After the success of Inner Me album and concert, Vũ Cát Tường appeared on International artist page of Billboard America, and received many compliments from Billboard, audiences and experts, media newsletters too.
"She spent more time and effort than ever before to create the album, because she wanted to take the first step to reach an international audience with good songs that she wrote herself, that would get the attention of this new audience and hopefully start to build a new fanbase outside Vietnam."

– Billboard USA

 Production crew and Partners 
 Dear Hanoi, concert Production crew Composer: Vũ Cát Tường
 Mix and master: Vũ Cát Tường, Nguyen Thanh Binh
 Production director: Vo Do Minh Hoang
 Stage director: Cao Trung Hieu
 Band: Mau Nuoc
 Production team: The Little Prince Entertainment, Viet Vision.Partners & SponsorsV Live
Levi's
Skechers
Yamaha
Viet Vision
Dinogo
VinID

 Inner Me concert Production team Composer: Vũ Cát Tường
 Mix and master: Vũ Cát Tường, Nguyen Thanh Binh
 Stage director: Nguyen Huu Thanh
 Production team: The Little Prince Entertainment, Box
 Dancers: OH Dance Crew
 Band: Potato
 Chorus team: CadillacPartners and sponsors'''
Levi's
V Live
Skechers
Box
Cat Tien Sa
VinID

References 

2019 concert tours
Concert tours of Asia